Gift Ugochukwu Christopher (born October 8, 1993) is a Nigerian singer, musician and gospel songwriter popularly known by his stage name Minister GUC. He gained recognition following the release of his first album in December 2020 with the hit tracks All that matters, Desperate and Yours. He officially began his music career in 2019 after he was signed by a record label, Eezee Conceptz.

Early life and education 
GUC was born on October 8, 1993, in Port Harcourt and originally hails from Emohua Local Government Area, Rivers State.  After his primary and secondary education, he proceeded to study at the University of Port Harcourt,Nigeria, in 2013.

Music career 
He started his musical career in Port Harcourt as part of a music team with his friends  In November 2019, GUC was signed to the record label, EeZee Conceptz to join Mercy Chinwo, Judikay and other gospel artistes. He released his first debut album in 2020 titled "The Message" comprising 12 tracks including All that matters, Desperate, Yours and God of Vengeance. In October 2020, GUC topped the list of gospel artistes in Nigeria to reach the highest views that same year on YouTube.

In April 2022, he released a 13-track album titled "To Yahweh's Delight".

Personal life 
GUC is currently married to Nkpoikana Ntuk (Nene Ntuk). The couple held their traditional wedding on 4 November 2021 and their white wedding on 6 March 2021 in Port Harcourt, Rivers State. On 6 March 2022, exactly one year after their marriage, the couple announced the birth of their daughter and first child.

Discography

Albums

Singles 

 The Bill (2020) 
 In this place (2021)
 Through Eternity (2022)
 Yahweh Remix (2022)
 Goodness of God (2023)

Awards and achievements

References 

Singers from Port Harcourt
Nigerian gospel singers
Living people